Gleich is a German language habitational surname. Notable people with the name include:
 Ashley Moyer-Gleich (1987), American professional basketball referee
 Caroline Gleich, American skier, mountaineer, and environmental activist
 Frank Gleich (1894–1949), backup outfielder in Major League Baseball 
 Gerhard Gleich (1941), Austrian artist 
 Gerold von Gleich (1869–1938), German army officer
 John Gleich (1879–1927), Baltic-German merchant, painter and publicist
 Jonathan Gleich (1958), activist from New York City
 Josef Alois Gleich (1772–1841), Austrian civil servant, and a prolific dramatist and novelist

German-language surnames
German toponymic surnames